Zane Knowles (born February 17, 1992) is a Bahamian professional basketball player for CSKA Sofia of the NBL.

Career 
In 2020, Knowles signed with Levski Lukoil of the NBL. He averaged 13.0 points, 7.0 rebounds and 1.5 steals per game in two games. On July 27, 2020, Knowles signed with Balıkesir Büyükşehir Belediyespor. On March 10, 2022, he returned to Levski. From the 2022/23 season he completes for CSKA Sofia.

References

External links
zane-knowles at espn.com
zane-knowles-1.html at basketball-reference.com

1992 births
Living people
Bahamian men's basketball players
Bahamian expatriate basketball people in Bulgaria
Bahamian expatriate basketball people in France
Bahamian expatriate basketball people in Hungary
Bahamian expatriate basketball people in Japan
Bahamian expatriate basketball people in Turkey
Bahamian expatriate basketball people in the United States
Grambling State Tigers men's basketball players
Texas A&M–Corpus Christi Islanders men's basketball players
Centers (basketball)
Étoile Charleville-Mézières players
P.A.O.K. BC players
Tokyo Cinq Rêves players
Twarde Pierniki Toruń players
Wakayama Trians players